The 57th edition of the Vuelta a Colombia was held from July 28 to August 12, 2007.

Stages

2007-07-28: Barranquilla — Barranquilla (6.6 km)

2007-07-29: Barranquilla — Aracataca (122.4 km)

2007-07-31: Aguachica — Barrancabermeja (189 km)

2007-08-01: Barrancabermeja — Piedecuesta (125 km)

2007-08-02: Socorro — Paipa (213 km)

2007-08-03: Paipa — La Vega (232.7 km)

2007-08-04: Mariquita — Manizales (123.6 km)

2007-08-05: Manizales — Las Palmas (201.4 km)

2007-08-06: Itagüí — Salgar (130.4 km)

2007-08-07: Salgar — Pereira (196.4 km)

2007-08-08: Pereira — Cali (220.2 km)

2007-08-09: Palmira — Calarcá (163.5 km)

2007-08-10: Calarcá — Agua de Dios (179.5 km)

2007-08-11: Melgar — Bogotá (122.9 km)

2007-08-13: Bogotá — Bogotá (34.9 km)

Final classification

Teams 

Lotería de Boyacá — Indeportes

Une Orbitel

Coordinadora — EBSA ESP

Coordinadora EMP Energia de Boyá

Gobernacíon de Zulia — Alcaldia Cabim

Tecos de Mexico

Lotería del Táchira — Banfoandes

Colombia es Pasion — Coldeportes

GW — Shimano

Gobernacíon de Boyacá — Alc Paipa

Sabana Centro Catedral de Sal

Frugos — Indervalle

Bogotá — IDRD

Postal Express — CMC Construccion

Studio TV — 9 Millonaria

See also 
 2007 Clásico RCN

References 
 cyclingnews

Vuelta a Colombia
Chile
Vuelta Ciclista